Thyroxine 5-deiodinase also known as type III iodothyronine deiodinase (EC number 1.21.99.3) is an enzyme that in humans is encoded by the DIO3 gene. This enzyme catalyses the following chemical reaction

 3,3',5'-triiodo-L-thyronine + iodide + A + H+  L-thyroxine + AH2

The protein encoded by this intronless gene belongs to the iodothyronine deiodinase family. It catalyzes the inactivation of thyroid hormone by inner ring deiodination of the prohormone thyroxine (T4) and the bioactive hormone 3,3',5-triiodothyronine (T3) to inactive metabolites, 3,3',5'-triiodothyronine (RT3) and 3,3'-diiodothyronine (T2), respectively. This enzyme is highly expressed in the pregnant uterus, placenta, fetal and neonatal tissues, suggesting that it plays an essential role in the regulation of thyroid hormone inactivation during embryological development.

Discovery 

The gene was mapped to chromosome 14q32 using fluorescence in situ hybridization (FISH) in 1998.

Structure 

This protein contains a selenocysteine (Sec) residue, which is essential for efficient enzyme activity. The selenocysteine is encoded by the UGA codon, which normally signals translation termination. The 3' UTR of Sec-containing genes have a common stem-loop structure, the sec insertion sequence (SECIS), which is necessary for the recognition of UGA as a Sec codon rather than as a stop signal.

Function 

The DIO3 gene codes for type 3 iodothyronine deiodinase (D3), an enzyme that inactivates thyroid hormones and is highly expressed throughout fetal development, peaking early and decreasing towards the end of gestation.  Part of the DLK1-Dio3 imprinting control region, this gene is one involved in the epigenetic process that causes a subset of genes to be regulated based on their parental origin .  Such imprinted genes are required for the formation of the placenta as well as the development of cellular lineages such as those derived from the mesoderm and ectoderm.  D3 is found in the pregnant uterus, placenta, and mammalian fetal tissues where it is thought to be involved in the transfer of thyroid hormone between the mother and fetus.  Expression of D3 contributes to the development of the brain, skin, liver, bone, ovary, testis, intestine, and brown adipose tissue.  Introductory observations of D3-deficient mice indicate growth retardation and even some neonatal death.  Due to its ability to activate or inactivate thyroid hormone, Dio3 coding of D3 could be a target for therapeutic intervention in insulin-related illness such as diabetes.  In addition, an abnormal amount of Dio3 related to insufficient thyroid hormone levels could be responsible for the disruption of brain development in conjunction with alcohol exposure.  Many factors modify genetic imprinting of Dio3, making it a potential aid in understanding prenatal insults and their production of spectrum disorders.

References

Further reading

External links 
 

EC 1.21.99
Genes on human chromosome 14
Developmental genes and proteins